Death Dive is a Canadian horror film, directed by Alain Vézina and released in 2015. The film centres on a zombie invasion in a small town in the Gaspésie region of Quebec, spawned after a journalist tries to investigate the appearance of a mysterious ghost ship in the St. Lawrence River.

The film's cast includes Éric Gagné, Édith Côté-Demers, Alexandre Landry, Raymond Bouchard, Béatrice Picard, Jean-Guy Bouchard, Pascale Létourneau, Benoit Rousseau, Widemir Normil, Charles Dauphinais, and Dominique Laniel.

It premiered in Quebec theatres in February 2015, and was subsequently screened at several international horror and fantasy film festivals, including the Sitges Film Festival. At the Torremolinos Fantastic Film Festival, it won the awards for Best Special Effects and Best Direction.

Joan-Patricia Parris and Mario Soucy received a Quebec Cinema Award nomination for Best Makeup at the 18th Quebec Cinema Awards in 2016.

References

External links

2015 films
2015 horror films
Canadian zombie films
Quebec films
French-language Canadian films
2010s Canadian films